The Palmerston Trophy Berlin was a men's senior (over 50) professional golf tournament on the European Seniors Tour, held on the Faldo course at the Sporting Club Berlin in Bad Saarow, 50 km south-west of Berlin, Germany. It was held just once, in June 2001, and was won by Denis O'Sullivan who finished four shots ahead of Seiji Ebihara and Eddie Polland. The total prize fund was €200,000 with the winner receiving €30,500.

Winners

References

External links
Coverage on the European Senior Tour's official site

Former European Senior Tour events
Golf tournaments in Germany